Calylophus  is a genus of flowering plants in the family Onagraceae.

Species include:

Calylophus berlandieri  Spach  (Berlandier's sundrops)   
Calylophus hartwegii (Benth.) Raven   (Hartweg's sundrops)   
Calylophus lavandulifolius   (Torr. & Gray) Raven (lavenderleaf eveningprimrose)
Calylophus serrulatus  (Nutt.) Raven (halfshrub sundrop) 
Calylophus toumeyi  (Small) Towner (Toumey's sundrops)   
Calylophus tubicula (Gray) Raven  (Texas sundrops)

References
ITIS standard report page: Calyophus

Onagraceae
Onagraceae genera